Lake Pushmataha is a  reservoir in the U.S. state of Mississippi.

Lake Pushmataha was named after Pushmataha, a Choctaw chieftain.

References

Pushmataha
Bodies of water of Neshoba County, Mississippi
Mississippi placenames of Native American origin